The 1925–26 season was Manchester City F.C.'s thirty-fifth season of league football and twelfth consecutive season in the Football League First Division, excluding the four years during the First World War in which no competitive football was played.

Coming off the back of a series of mid-table finishes and largely unimpressive FA Cup campaigns, manager David Ashworth's resignation in November 1925 bizarrely resulted in both a first league relegation since 1909 and a first FA Cup final appearance since 1904 as well as a record 6–1 victory over rivals Manchester United, with much of the second half of the campaign being run in Ashworth's absence by a committee led by club Vice-Chairman Albert Alexander.

Team Kit

Football League First Division

Results summary

Reports

FA Cup

Squad statistics

Squad
Appearances for competitive matches only

Scorers

See also
Manchester City F.C. seasons

References

External links
Extensive Manchester City statistics site

Manchester City F.C. seasons
Manchester City F.C.